Kultar Gill is a retired professional Indian-Canadian welterweight Muay Thai kickboxer and Lightweight mixed martial artist. He is the owner of Mamba MMA in Abbotsford, British Columbia.

Background
Gill is from British Columbia, Canada and is of Indian descent. He began the martial arts when he was "14 or 15" years old, when he began practicing Muay Thai.

Mixed martial arts career 
Gill was scheduled to compete in K-1 Hero's 2007 Middleweight Grand Prix, where his fight was going to be a rematch with Caol Uno in the semi-finals on September 17, 2007 with the winner moving on to the finals later that night. However he missed the tournament due to a shoulder injury. Kultar has opened his new gym in Abbotsford, British Columbia Canada, Team Mamba, where professional fighters such as Sabah Fadai, Gary Mangat, and Kajan Johnson have trained.

Gill's notable opponents also include Yves Edwards and Hideo Tokoro (twice), the second match being one in which he showed markedly improved submission defense.  This is notable given that his background is Muay Thai, a discipline in which he was ranked sixth in the world at one point. His background also includes wrestling, where he was the British Columbia champion as a young man. In a recent interview, he boldly predicted a 1st round KO victory if he were to have a rematch with the highly touted Caol Uno.

Gill's most recent kickboxing match was a loss to Buakaw Por. Pramuk at K-1 World MAX 2008 Final.

Super Fight League

After nearly four years in retirement, Gill announced that he will be returning to mixed martial arts at Super Fight League 3 against South African kickboxer Quinton Arendse for the Super Fight League in Delhi, India.  He was successful in his MMA return, winning via KO in the first round.

The SFL then signed him to a four fight contract.

Mixed martial arts record

|-
| Win
| align=center| 13–8
| Anthony Ruiz
| Submission (triangle choke)
| Mamba Fight Night 6
| 
| align=center| 1
| align=center| 4:28
| Abbotsford, Canada
|Catchweight (192 lbs) bout.
| 
|-|-
| Win
| align=center| 12–8
| Amr Wahman
| TKO (punches)
| SFL 4
| 
| align=center| 1
| align=center| 4:39
| Mumbai, India
| 
|-
| Win
| align=center| 11–8
| Quinton Arendse
| KO (punches)
| SFL 3
| 
| align=center| 1
| align=center| 0:51
| New Delhi, Delhi India
| 
|-
| Loss
| align=center| 10–8
| Joachim Hansen
| Submission (armbar)
| Dream 5: Lightweight Grand Prix 2008 Final Round
| 
| align=center| 1
| align=center| 2:35
| Osaka-jo Hall, Japan
| 
|-
| Loss
| align=center| 10–7
| Tatsuya Kawajiri
| Decision (unanimous)
| Dream 1: Lightweight Grand Prix 2008 First Round
| 
| align=center| 2
| align=center| 5:00
| Saitama, Japan
| 
|-
| Win
| align=center| 10–6
| Hideo Tokoro
| TKO (punches)
| Hero's 9
| 
| align=center| 1
| align=center| 4:47
| Yokohama, Japan
| Hero's 2007 LW GP quarter-final.
|-
| Loss
| align=center| 9–6
| Kazuyuki Miyata
| Submission (guillotine choke)
| Hero's 8
| 
| align=center| 1
| align=center| 3:38
| Nagoya, Japan
| 
|-
| Loss
| align=center| 9–5
| Rodrigo Damm
| Submission (rear-naked choke)
| BodogFight: St. Petersburg
| 
| align=center| 2
| align=center| 2:11
| St. Petersburg, Russia
| 
|-
| Loss
| align=center| 9–4
| Caol Uno
| Submission (rear-naked choke)
| Hero's 6
| 
| align=center| 2
| align=center| 3:30
| Tokyo, Japan
| Hero's 2006 LW GP quarterfinal.
|-
| Win
| align=center| 9–3
| Hideo Tokoro
| KO (knee)
| Hero's 5
| 
| align=center| 1
| align=center| 0:43
| Tokyo, Japan
| Hero's 2006 LW GP opening round
|-
| Loss
| align=center| 8–3
| Daisuke Sugie
| Submission (triangle choke)
| Shooto: Gig Central 8
| 
| align=center| 1
| align=center| 1:42
| Nagoya, Japan
| 
|-
| Win
| align=center| 8–2
| Harris Sarmiento
| Submission (rear-naked choke)
| SB 39: Destiny
| 
| align=center| 3
| align=center| 2:15
| Honolulu, Hawaii, United States
| 
|-
| Loss
| align=center| 7–2
| Fabio Holanda
| Submission (kimura)
| TKO Major League MMA
| 
| align=center| 1
| align=center| 3:00
| Quebec, Canada
| 
|-
| Win
| align=center| 7–1
| Dave Rivas
| Submission (rear-naked choke)
| PXC 2: Chaos
| 
| align=center| 2
| align=center| 1:10
| Guam
| 
|-
| Win
| align=center| 6–1
| Donald Ouimet
| Submission (rear-naked choke)
| UCC 12: Adrenaline
| 
| align=center| 1
| align=center| 1:51
| Quebec, Canada
| 
|-
| Win
| align=center| 5–1
| Kevin Dolan
| TKO (strikes)
| MFC: Unplugged
| 
| align=center| 1
| align=center| 2:03
| Alberta, Canada
| 
|-
| Win
| align=center| 4–1
| Dave Scholten
| Submission (rear-naked choke)
| World Freestyle Fighting 3
| 
| align=center| 1
| align=center| 2:06
| Vancouver, British Columbia, Canada
| 
|-
| Loss
| align=center| 3–1
| Yves Edwards
| Submission (heel hook)
| Shogun 1
| 
| align=center| 2
| align=center| 2:49
| Honolulu, Hawaii, United States
| 
|-
| Win
| align=center| 3–0
| Trevor Michaelis
| Submission (rear-naked choke)
| UFCF: Everett Extreme Challenge 4
| 
| align=center| 1
| align=center| N/A
| Everett, Washington, United States
| 
|-
| Win
| align=center| 2–0
| Dan Shenk
| Submission (rear-naked choke)
| Western Freestyle Championships
| 
| align=center| 1
| align=center| N/A
| British Columbia, Canada
| 
|-
| Win
| align=center| 1–0
| JR Wallace
| Decision (unanimous)
| Western Canada's Toughest
| 
| align=center| 3
| align=center| N/A
| Vernon, British Columbia, Canada
|

Kickboxing record (incomplete)

References

External links
Official website

Interview for TakeCancerOut.com - Part 1
Interview for TakeCancerOut.com - Part 2
Interview for TakeCancerOut.com - Part 3
Fighting for Personal and National pride

1979 births
Canadian male kickboxers
Indian male kickboxers
Welterweight kickboxers
Canadian male mixed martial artists
Indian male mixed martial artists
Lightweight mixed martial artists
Mixed martial artists utilizing Muay Thai
Canadian Muay Thai practitioners
Indian Muay Thai practitioners
Living people
People from Mission, British Columbia
Sportspeople from British Columbia
Canadian sportspeople of Indian descent